Dog Peak (Montenegrin and Serbian: Пасји врх, Pasji vrh) is a mountain peak found in the border between Kosovo and Montenegro. This peak is one of the highest of the Bogićevica mountain area. One of Dog Peaks neighbours is Marijaš at  being the highest peak of Bogićevica.

Notes and references
Notes:

References:

Mountains of Kosovo
Mountains of Montenegro
Kosovo–Montenegro border
International mountains of Europe
Accursed Mountains